In mathematics, a subsequential limit of a sequence is the limit of some subsequence. Every subsequential limit is a cluster point, but not conversely. In first-countable spaces, the two concepts coincide.

In a topological space, if every subsequence has a subsequential limit to the same point, then the original sequence also converges to that limit. This need not hold in more generalized notions of convergence, such as the space of almost everywhere convergence.

The supremum of the set of all subsequential limits of some sequence is called the limit superior, or limsup. Similarly, the infimum of such a set is called the limit inferior, or liminf. See limit superior and limit inferior.

If  is a metric space and there is a Cauchy sequence such that there is a subsequence converging to some  then the sequence also converges to

See also

 
 
 
 
 
 

Limits (mathematics)
Sequences and series